Gonzalo Barroilhet Costabal (born August 19, 1986 in Santiago, Chile) is a male decathlete from Chile. He competed for his native country at the 2008 and 2012 Summer Olympics. He is affiliated with the Florida State Seminoles in Tallahassee, Florida.

Personal bests
100 m: 10.99 (wind: +0.8 m/s) – Charlottesville, Virginia, 19 April 2012
400 m: 49.82 – Des Moines, Iowa, 6 June 2012
1500 m: 4:37.04 – Des Moines, Iowa, 7 June 2012
110 m hurdles: 13.78 (wind: +0.6 m/s) – Tallahassee, Florida, 30 May 2008
High jump: 2.06 m – Charlottesville, Virginia, 19 April 2012
Pole vault: 5.45 m – Atlanta, Georgia, 11 May 2012
Long jump: 7.15 m (wind: -0.3 m/s) – São Paulo, 7 June 2007
Shot put: 14.52 m – Atlanta, Georgia, 13 April 2013
Discus throw: 47.63 m – Santiago, 15 March 2014
Javelin throw: 57.83 m – São Paulo, 6 August 2011
Decathlon: 8065 pts NR – Charlottesville, Virginia, 20 April 2012

Competition record

References

External links 
 IAAF profile for Gonzalo Barroilhet
 

1986 births
Living people
Chilean decathletes
Olympic athletes of Chile
Athletes (track and field) at the 2007 Pan American Games
Athletes (track and field) at the 2008 Summer Olympics
Athletes (track and field) at the 2011 Pan American Games
Athletes (track and field) at the 2012 Summer Olympics
Pan American Games competitors for Chile
Sportspeople from Santiago
Florida State University alumni
South American Games silver medalists for Chile
South American Games bronze medalists for Chile
South American Games medalists in athletics
Competitors at the 2006 South American Games
Competitors at the 2014 South American Games
21st-century Chilean people